Tan Sri Razarudin bin Husain (Jawi: رضاالدين ابن حسين; born 15 March 1963) is a Malaysian police officer who has served as Deputy Inspector-General of Police since December 2021.

Police career
Razarudin joined the police force on 27 December 1982 at the age of 19. He had served as Deputy Commander of Special Task Force On Organised Crime (STAFOC) in 2013. In 2016, Razarudin promoted to Deputy Commissioner of Police and served as Sabah Deputy Police Commissioner. In 2018, Razarudin assumed the post of Perak Deputy Police Chief and in 2019 he served as Perak Police Chief. In 9 September 2020, he served as Director of Bukit Aman Narcotics Crime Investigation Department. In 22 December 2021, he was appointed as Deputy Inspector-General of Police, replacing Mazlan Lazim who later retired on 25 December 2021.

Honours
  :
  Commander of the Order of Loyalty to the Crown of Malaysia (PSM) – Tan Sri (2022)
  Royal Malaysia Police :
  Courageous Commander of the Most Gallant Police Order (PGPP) (2021)
  :
  Member of the Order of Kinabalu (ADK) (2008)
  Commander of the Order of Kinabalu (PGDK) – Datuk (2021)
  :
  Knight Companion of the Order of the Crown of Pahang (DIMP) – Dato’ (2013)
  Grand Knight of the Order of Sultan Ahmad Shah of Pahang (SSAP) – Dato’ Sri (2022)
  :
  Knight Commander of the Order of Taming Sari (DPTS) – Dato’ Pahlawan (2020)
  Knight Grand Commander of the Order of Taming Sari (SPTS) – Dato’ Seri Panglima (2022)

References 

1963 births
Living people
Malaysian people of Malay descent
Malaysian Muslims
Malaysian police officers
People from Selangor
Commanders of the Order of Kinabalu
National University of Malaysia alumni
Commanders of the Order of Loyalty to the Crown of Malaysia